The 2019 Liga 1 U-18 (known as the Super Soccer TV Elite Pro Academy Liga 1 U-18 2019 for sponsorship reasons) was the first season of the Liga 1 Elite Pro Academy U-18. The league is currently the youth level (U-18) football league in Indonesia. The season started on 15 June and finished with a final on 25 November 2019.

Bhayangkara U18s won the title after defeating PSIS U18s 1–0 in the final.

First round
First round was the group stage and started on 15 June 2019. Group A and B played home and away double-game round-robin tournament while Group C played four-series home tournament with five matches for each series. The winners and runner-ups from each group along with two best third-placed teams advanced to second round.

Group A

Group B

Group C

Ranking of third-placed teams

Second round
Second round was the group stage and was played on 14–21 November 2019. All groups played on a single-game round-robin home tournament. The winners and runner-ups from each group advanced to semi-finals. The draw for the group was held on 8 November 2019.

Group X

|}

Group Y

|}

Knock-out round

Bracket

Semi-finals

Third place

Final

Awards
 Top goalscorers: Kadek Dimas Satria (Bali United U18s, 16 goals)
 Best player: Irfan Jauhari (Bali United U18s)
 Best referee: Bayu Pratama
 Best coach: Dwi Prio Utomo (Bhayangkara U18s)
 Best academy: Persija U18s
 Fair-play team: Bhayangkara U18s

References

Liga 1 U-18
Liga 1 U-18
Liga 1 U-18